The 2015 Valais Youth Cup was an international football tournament that featured four youth teams. It was played at the Complexe Sportif du Bout du Lac in Le Bouveret, Switzerland.

Participants

The competition featured four youth clubs:
 FC Sion
 AS Monaco
 FC Porto
 Atlético Madrid

Competition format

Matches

Semi-finals

Third place play-off

Final

References

External links
 Official website

2015